Ellis Lee Barkworth (born 15 October 1997) is an English professional footballer who plays for Scarborough Athletic as a midfielder.

Club career

Hull City 
Barkworth joined Hull City at the age of nine and signed a professional deal in May 2016. On 22 August 2017, he made his debut in a 2–0 EFL Cup defeat to Doncaster Rovers.

Statistics

References

External links
Ellis Barkworth at Footballdatabase

1997 births
Living people
English footballers
Association football defenders
Hull City A.F.C. players
Tadcaster Albion A.F.C. players
Scarborough F.C. players